The Qi Kingdom was a kingdom that existed from the Chu–Han Contention period to late 2nd century BC, located in present-day Shandong and some surrounding areas.

History
The kingdom was established on the former territories of the state of Qi (11th century BC – 221 BC), a great power during the Warring States period until its annexation by the Qin. In 206 BC, Xiang Yu divided the Qin empire into Eighteen Kingdoms. Three of them – Qi, Jiaodong and Jibei – were founded on Qi territories and were ruled by the former state's aristocrats. In 203 BC, the region was conquered by Han Xin, a prominent military general serving under Liu Bang, the later Emperor Gaozu of Han dynasty. Han Xin was briefly granted the title "King of Qi", but was later offered Chu instead.

In 201 BC, Emperor Gaozu installed his eldest son Liu Fei as the King of Qi, known posthumously as King Daohui. According to an order by Emperor Gaozu, "All the people who are able to speak the language of Qi shall be granted to Qi [Kingdom]." At the time, Qi consisted of seven commanderies, namely Linzi, Boyang, Jibei, Jiaodong, Jiaoxi, Chengyang and Langya.

After the death of Emperor Gaozu, the Han court was dominated by Empress Lü. In 193 BC, Liu Fei offered Chengyang to Princess Yuan of Lu, daughter of Empress Lü, as her fief. In 187 BC, a part of Jinan was split off to form the Kingdom of Lü, ruled by the empress' nephew Lü Tai (呂台). In 181 BC, Langya was also separated from Qi to form a new kingdom held by Liu Ze (劉澤), nephew-in-law of the empress.

Liu Fei died in 189 BC and was succeeded by his son Xiang. In 180 BC, Qi participated in the war against the Lü clan. Afterwards, the three commanderies Chengyang, Jinan and Langya was returned to the kingdom. Qi passed to Liu Ze (劉則), a son of Xiang, after the latter's death in 179 BC. Xiang's brothers Zhang and Xingju received Jibei and Chengyang, respectively, as their own kingdoms. Jibei was revoked by the Han government when Xingju attempted to rebel in 177 BC.

Ze died in 165 BC, leaving no male issue. Qi was subsequently divided between Fei's surviving sons. The territory under Liu Jianglü (劉將閭) retained the name "Qi", however, it only covered the Linzi Commandery. Jianglü's line continued until 126 BC. In 117 BC, the reigning Emperor Wu granted Qi to his son Liu Hong (劉閎), who also died without issue in 110 BC. Afterwards, the kingdom was converted to the Qi Commandery.

Kings

References

Kingdoms of the Han dynasty